Little Berger is an unincorporated community in Gasconade County, in the U.S. state of Missouri.

History
A post office called Little Berger was established in 1872, and remained in operation until 1901. The community takes its name from nearby Little Berger Creek.

References

Unincorporated communities in Gasconade County, Missouri
Unincorporated communities in Missouri